Modes of Transportation Vol. 2: What's a Boy to Do? is an album released by Spookey Ruben in 1998, and was only ever released in Japan, but is now available as an import through Amazon.com and by digital release. The album had three singles reach the top 20 following its Japanese release.

Tracks from this album later appeared on his double album Bed and Breakfast more than three years later. In an interview, Spookey explained, "I got permission to use them (to re-use for the double album). They’re [TVT Records] going to get a cut off this record."

Reception 

As this album was never commercially released in the United States, there are very few reviews published for it. One review by the website FrankDoris.com exclaims, "What's A Boy to Do? is a wild, exhilarating melange of styles and sounds, colliding, blending together, copulating and producing bizarre, mutated offspring. Take the first track, "Sex Traffic," (gotta be an homage to Kraftwerk's Sex Object")—a dizzying mix of French female vocal samples, snapping synthesizers, rubber-band ostinato bass, gritty electronic drums, sampled squealing tires and robotic monotonous vocals intoning "Sex Traffic" over it all—but it's freakin' fantastic! Then before you've recovered, Ruben jump-cuts into "My Female Friends," its gorgeous piano chords, buoyant vocal and synth melodies and galloping rhythm three minutes and forty-four seconds of pure pop adrenaline. The record is a roller coaster thrill-ride of moods and kaleidoscopic instrumental sounds, from unbelievably pure and well-recorded acoustic guitars, glockenspiels and percussion to unbelievably processed squealing synths and sampled vocals. Actually, some of the sounds are completely unrecognizable."

Track listing 
 Sex Traffic
 My Female Friends
 My Favorite Movie
 Why Did I Do What I Did
 Someone Else
 Who Pulls You Through
 N Kinski
 Don't Take Your Dog To The Park
 Dizzy Playground
 Roncesvalles
 Memory
 Lazy
 Overhill (Bonus)
 Mennonite Lady (Bonus)

References

External links 
 Order the album at Amazon
 Hi-Hat's Website

1998 albums
Spookey Ruben albums

de:Spookey Ruben